The Municipality of Gordon/Barrie Island is a township in Manitoulin District in north central Ontario, Canada. It was formed on January 1, 2009, upon the amalgamation of the townships of Gordon and Barrie Island.

The township consists of the communities of Advance, Foxey, Ice Lake, Tobacco Lake and Barrie Island. Gordon/Barrie Island also contains three lakes: Nameless Lake, Tobacco Lake and Ice Lake.

Barrie Island
It is connected to Manitoulin by Highway 540A, which crosses the water via a causeway at the narrowest part of the strait.

The island has a significant summer recreational population.

John Gordon Lane was born on Barrie Island, the Member of Provincial Parliament for Algoma—Manitoulin from 1971 to 1987.

Demographics 

Population trend:
 Population in 2011: 526
 Gordon Township: 491
 Barrie Island Township: 35
 Population in 2006: 
 Gordon Township: 412
 Barrie Island Township: 47
 Population in 2001: 
 Gordon Township: 473
 Barrie Island Township: 50
 Population in 1996:
 Gordon Township: 470 (adjusted for 2001 boundaries)
 Barrie Island Township: 60
 Population in 1991: 
 Barrie Island Township: 75

See also
List of townships in Ontario

References

External links

 

Municipalities in Manitoulin District
Single-tier municipalities in Ontario